The Essex Wildlife Trust (EWT) is one of 46 wildlife trusts which cover the United Kingdom. The EWT was founded in 1959, and it describes itself as Essex's leading conservation charity, which aims to protect wildlife for the future and the people of the county. As of January 2017, it has over 34,000 members and runs 87 nature reserves, 2 nature parks and 11 visitor centres.

Essex has one of the longest coastlines of any English county, with saltmarshes, lagoons, mudflats, grazing marshes, reedbeds and shingle. Its ancient forests were formerly important to the local economy, with wood being used for fuel, construction and bark in the tanning industry. Coppicing is being re-introduced by the EWT to encourage woodland grasses, flowers, invertebrates and birds. A few grasslands on the heavy clays of south- and mid-Essex are still grazed according to traditional methods, supporting a mixture of pasture and fen. Some brownfield sites, often on contaminated soil, have populations of nationally scarce species, particularly invertebrates.

The EWT's first site was Fingringhoe Wick, which was established in 1961; its visitor centre has views over the Colne Estuary. The largest site is the  Hanningfield Reservoir, which has nationally important numbers of gadwalls and a rare moss. The whole or part of 6 sites are Ramsar internationally important wetland sites, 29 are Sites of Special Scientific Interest, 3 are national nature reserves, 4 are Special Protection Areas, 2 are Special Areas of Conservation, 7 are Nature Conservation Review sites, 2 are a Geological Conservation Review sites, 2 are scheduled monuments and 7 are local nature reserves.

Nature reserves

Key

Classifications
EWTVC = Essex Wildlife Trust Visitor Centre
GCR = Geological Conservation Review
LNR = Local nature reserve
NCR = Nature Conservation Review
NNR = National nature reserve
Ramsar = Internationally important Ramsar wetland site
SAC = Special Area of Conservation
SM = Scheduled monument
SPA = Special Protection Area
SSSI = Site of Special Scientific Interest

Access
 BPA  = Access only by prior arrangement with the EWT
 EWTO  = EWT members only
 FP   = Access to footpaths only
 PP   = Access to part of the site
 YES   = Free public access to all or most of the site

See also
List of Sites of Special Scientific Interest in Essex
List of Local Nature Reserves in Essex

Notes

Citations

Sources

External links
Essex Wildlife Trust website

 
Wildlife Trusts of England